is a professional Japanese football player. He plays as a goalkeeper for Kochi United.

Club statistics
Updated to 23 February 2018.

References

External links

 Profile at Júbilo Iwata

1988 births
Living people
Aichi Gakuin University alumni
Association football people from Nara Prefecture
Japanese footballers
J1 League players
J2 League players
Sagan Tosu players
Júbilo Iwata players
V-Varen Nagasaki players
Association football goalkeepers